The 2009 Supercoppa Italiana was a match played by the 2008–09 Serie A winners Internazionale and 2008–09 Coppa Italia winners Lazio. It took place on 8 August 2009 at the Beijing National Stadium in Beijing, China. Lazio won the match 2–1 to earn their third Supercoppa title. This edition was the first time the Supercoppa Italiana was held in China, with China becoming the fourth country to host the competition.

Match details

Ticket sales
By 15 July 2009, approximately half the 70,000 tickets for the match had been sold.
By mid-noon of 6 August 2009, 56,780 tickets had been sold.
Approximately two hours before the commencement of the match, 68,961 tickets had been sold.

Others
Because the matchday marked the one-year anniversary of the 2008 Beijing Olympics, the organization invited 100 Chinese Olympic gold medallists to attend the match.

References

2009
Supercoppa 2009
Supercoppa 2009
Supercoppa Italiana
Super